The National Bureau of Statistics oversees and publishes statistics for Nigeria.

Contributing Bureaus
The contributing bureaus are where the National Bureau of Statistics get their information. They include:
 National Planning Commission
 Economic and Financial Crimes Commission
 Federal Ministry of Health
 National Population Commission
 Nigerian Stock Exchange
 Nigerian Embassies and High Commissions
 Federal Ministry of Finance
 Central Bank of Nigeria
 Nigerian National Petroleum Corporation
 Nigerian Electricity Regulatory Commission

Some Statistics for Q2, 2009
 Telecommunications / Postal Service is accountable for 3.87% of the GDP
 Manufacturing is accountable for 3.95% of the GDP
 Building & Construction is accountable for 1.94% of the GDP
 Crude Petroleum & Natural Gas is accountable for 16.01% of the GDP
 Agriculture is accountable for 43% of the GDP
 Non-oil Growth was about 8.27%

External links

Government of Nigeria
Nigeria